Jah Hut (Jah Het) is an Austroasiatic  language spoken around the Krau river in peninsular Malaysia. The Jah Hut are one of the indigenous Orang Asli peoples.

Classification 
Jah Hut belongs to the Aslian branch of the Austroasiatic language family. Previously thought to be a member of the Central Aslian sub-branch, Jah Hut is now considered an isolate.

Dialects
 Kerdau
 Krau
 Ketiar Krau
 Kuala Tembeling
 Pulau Guai
 Cheres
 Ulu Tembeling

Phonology 
Jah Hut has 9 vowels and 19 consonants.

Morphology 

Jah Hut does not contain open major syllables in word-final positions. Conversely, the language contains 15 consonants that can be used to close a syllable. Further, in the context in which a nasalized vowel or consonant occurs earlier in a given word, the final stop is broken down into a nasal and glottal stop.

Does not contain restrictions on non-homorganic stop clusters, meaning that many words begin with consonants that don’t phonetically match. (i.e. words that begin with ‘tk’ or ‘bk’). This pattern can be found in many other Aslian languages.
  - palate
  - Bamboo Rat
  - gray 

Jah Hut varies from other Mon-Khmer languages in that it contains little-to-no phonetic vowel length. By using this, the speaker is able to indicate that a specific something or someone causes something or someone to be or do something else.

Similarly, the prefix  allows the user of the language to assign an act to a person. For example, in Jah Hut, means "to plait palm leaves", while  is translated as, "one who plaits". On the other hand, when an act does not involve a person directly, the agent of the act can be found in a prefixed or infixed , depending on the root of the given word. i.e.

Syntax 
In Jah Hut, all complements but the direct object require a preposition and, like many Aslian languages, verb usage in Jah Hut is restricted generally to strings of no more than 2 verbs, with the first verb referencing some form of motion, with the second verb representing the major action. Another form of verb usage is a form which uses the first verb as the major action, with the second verb describing the manner in which the verb is enacted. Also, if a verb is attached to a personal prefix, this must always agree with the agent of the sentence, regardless of where these two components of the sentence are located.

References

External links 
 http://projekt.ht.lu.se/rwaai RWAAI (Repository and Workspace for Austroasiatic Intangible Heritage)
 http://hdl.handle.net/10050/00-0000-0000-0003-66F7-5@view Jah Hut in RWAAI Digital Archive

Languages of Malaysia
Aslian languages
Orang Asli